Alan Jones (born 13 January 1944) is a Welsh former professional footballer who played as a winger. He played in the English football league for Wrexham. He also played for Johnstown and Witton Albion.

References

1944 births
Living people
Welsh footballers
Association football wingers
Wrexham A.F.C. players
Witton Albion F.C. players
English Football League players